Kit Carson is a Statutory Town in Cheyenne County, Colorado, United States.  The population was 233 at the 2010 United States Census.

History
The town was named in honor of frontiersman Christopher Houston "Kit" Carson.

Geography
Kit Carson is located at  (38.763999, -102.793843).

Demographics

As of the census of 2000, there were 253 people, 113 households, and 64 families residing in the town. The racial makeup of the town was 92.49% White, 6.72% from other races, and 0.79% from two or more races. Hispanic or Latino of any race were 8.70% of the population.

There were 113 households, out of which 24.8% had children under the age of 18 living with them, 47.8% were married couples living together, 8.0% had a female householder with no husband present, and 42.5% were non-families. 41.6% of all households were made up of individuals, and 25.7% had someone living alone who was 65 years of age or older.  The average household size was 2.12 and the average family size was 2.94.

In the town, the population was spread out, with 23.3% under the age of 18, 5.1% from 18 to 24, 21.3% from 25 to 44, 20.6% from 45 to 64, and 29.6% who were 65 years of age or older.  The median age was 45 years. For every 100 females, there were 86.0 males.  For every 100 females age 18 and over, there were 81.3 males.

The median income for a household in the town was $19,531, and the median income for a family was $37,500. Males had a median income of $34,375 versus $16,818 for females. The per capita income for the town was $13,832.  About 6.5% of families and 12.7% of the population were below the poverty line, including 13.4% of those under the age of eighteen and 20.0% of those 65 or over.

See also

Outline of Colorado
Index of Colorado-related articles
State of Colorado
Colorado cities and towns
Colorado municipalities
Colorado counties
Cheyenne County, Colorado
Kit Carson Mesa

References

External links

Town of Kit Carson contacts
CDOT map of the Town of Kit Carson

Towns in Cheyenne County, Colorado
Towns in Colorado